Percy Leo Fowler (14 December 1902 – 3 November 1976) was a New Zealand broadcaster, writer, radio producer and manager. He was born in Litherland, Lancashire, England.

References

1902 births
1976 deaths
New Zealand writers
New Zealand radio producers
British emigrants to New Zealand